Chongyang County is a county of southeastern Hubei province, People's Republic of China, bordering Hunan province to the west and Jiangxi province to the southeast. It is under the administration of Xianning City.

Administrative Divisions
Eight towns:
Tiancheng, Shaping, Shicheng, Guihuaquan, Baini, Lukou, Jintang, Qingshan

Four townships:
Xiaoling Township, Tongzhong Township, Gangkou Township, Gaojian Township

One other area:
Chongyang County Industrial Park District

Climate

References

Counties of Hubei
Xianning